The 1968 African Cup of Nations was the sixth edition of the Africa Cup of Nations, the soccer championship of Africa (CAF). It was hosted by Ethiopia. The field expanded to eight teams, split into two groups of four; the top two teams in each group advanced to the semifinals. Congo-Kinshasa won its first championship, beating Ghana in the final 1−0.

Prior to this tournament, the African Cup of Nations were held once every three years, following 1968 they were held once every two years.

Qualified teams 

The 8 qualified teams are:

Squads

Venues

Group stage

Group A

Group B

Knockout stage

Semi-finals

Third place match

Final

Goalscorers 
6 goals
  Laurent Pokou

5 goals
  Wilberforce Mfum

4 goals
  Osei Kofi

3 goals

  Hacène Lalmas
  Luciano Vassalo

2 goals

  Jean "Jeannot" Foutika
  Nicodème Kabamba
  Kidumu Mantantu
  Léon Mungamuni
  Yatma Diop
  Yatma Diouck
  Mengistu Worku

1 goal

  Mokhtar Khalem
  Boualem Amirouche
  Ignace Muwawa
  Saio Ernest Mokili
  Pierre Kalala Mukendi
  Elias Tshimanga
  Jean-Louis Bozon
  Henri Konan
  Eustache Manglé
  Bekuretsion Gebrehiwot
  Shewangizaw Agonafer
  Girma Tekle
  Frank Odoi
  Ibrahim Sunday
  Doudou Diongue
  Denis Obua
  Polly Ouma

External links 
 Details at RSSSF

 
Nations
Africa Cup Of Nations, 1968
International association football competitions hosted by Ethiopia
Africa Cup of Nations tournaments
Africa Cup of Nations